Łukasiewicz–Moisil algebras (LMn algebras) were introduced in the 1940s by Grigore Moisil (initially under the name of Łukasiewicz algebras) in the hope of giving algebraic semantics for the n-valued Łukasiewicz logic. However, in 1956 Alan Rose discovered that for n ≥ 5, the Łukasiewicz–Moisil algebra does not model the Łukasiewicz logic. A faithful model for the ℵ0-valued (infinitely-many-valued) Łukasiewicz–Tarski logic was provided by C. C. Chang's MV-algebra, introduced in 1958. For the axiomatically more complicated (finite) n-valued Łukasiewicz logics, suitable algebras were published in 1977 by Revaz Grigolia and called MVn-algebras. MVn-algebras are a subclass of LMn-algebras, and the inclusion is strict for n ≥ 5. In 1982 Roberto Cignoli published some additional constraints that added to LMn-algebras produce proper models for n-valued Łukasiewicz logic; Cignoli called his discovery proper Łukasiewicz algebras.

Moisil however, published in 1964 a logic to match his algebra (in the general n ≥ 5 case), now called Moisil logic. After coming in contact with Zadeh's fuzzy logic, in 1968 Moisil also introduced an infinitely-many-valued logic variant and its corresponding LMθ algebras. Although the Łukasiewicz implication cannot be defined in a LMn algebra for n ≥ 5, the Heyting implication can be, i.e. LMn algebras are Heyting algebras; as a result, Moisil logics can also be developed (from a purely logical standpoint) in the framework of Brower’s intuitionistic logic.

Definition 
A LMn algebra is a De Morgan algebra (a notion also introduced by Moisil) with n-1 additional unary, "modal" operations: , i.e. an algebra of signature  where J = { 1, 2, ... n-1 }. The additional unary operators ∇j must satisfy the following axioms for all x, y ∈ A and j, k ∈ J:

 
 
 
 
 
 if  for all j ∈ J, then x = y.

(The adjective "modal" is related to the [ultimately failed] program of Tarksi and Łukasiewicz to axiomatize modal logic using many-valued logic.)

Elementary properties 
The duals of some of the above axioms follow as properties:
 
 

In other words, the unary "modal" operations  are lattice endomorphisms.

Examples 
LM2 algebras are the Boolean algebras. The canonical Łukasiewicz algebra  that Moisil had in mind were over the set L_n = } with negation  conjunction  and disjunction  and the unary "modal" operators:

If B is a Boolean algebra, then the algebra over the set B[2] ≝ {(x, y) ∈ B×B | x ≤ y} with the lattice operations defined pointwise and with ¬(x, y) ≝ (¬y, ¬x), and with the unary "modal" operators ∇2(x, y) ≝ (y, y) and ∇1(x, y) = ¬∇2¬(x, y) = (x, x) [derived by axiom 4] is a three-valued Łukasiewicz algebra.

Representation 
Moisil proved that every LMn algebra can be embedded in a direct product (of copies) of the canonical  algebra.

The Heyting implication can be defined as:

Antonio Monteiro showed that for every monadic Boolean algebra one can construct a trivalent Łukasiewicz algebra (by taking certain equivalence classes) and that any trivalent Łukasiewicz algebra is isomorphic to a Łukasiewicz algebra thus derived from a monadic Boolean algebra. Cignoli summarizes the importance of this result as: "Since it was shown by Halmos that monadic Boolean algebras are the algebraic counterpart of classical first order monadic calculus, Monteiro considered that the representation of three-valued Łukasiewicz algebras into monadic Boolean algebras gives a proof of the consistency of Łukasiewicz three-valued logic relative to classical logic."

References

Further reading 
 
 Boicescu, V., Filipoiu, A., Georgescu, G., Rudeanu, S.: Łukasiewicz-Moisil Algebras. North-Holland, Amsterdam (1991) 
 Iorgulescu, A.: Connections between MVn-algebras and n-valued Łukasiewicz–Moisil algebras—II. Discrete Math. 202, 113–134 (1999) 
 Iorgulescu, A.: Connections between MVn-algebras and n-valued Łukasiewicz-Moisil—III. Unpublished Manuscript
 Iorgulescu, A.: Connections between MVn-algebras and n-valued Łukasiewicz–Moisil algebras—IV. J. Univers. Comput. Sci. 6, 139–154 (2000) 
 R. Cignoli, Algebras de Moisil de orden n, Ph.D. Thesis, Universidad National del Sur, Bahia Blanca, 1969
 http://projecteuclid.org/download/pdf_1/euclid.ndjfl/1093635424

Algebraic logic
Ockham algebras